1966–67 was the 20th season of the Western International Hockey League.

Standings
 Nelson Maple Leafs 		50		39	10	 1				272	148		 79
 Spokane Jets			50		33	15	 2				285	186		 68
 Kimberley Dynamiters		50		24	24	 2				222	222		 50
 Trail Smoke Eaters		50		20	26	 4				222	241		 44
 Rossland Warriors		50		18	29	 3				201	264		 39
 Cranbrook Royals		50		 9	39	 2				183	342		 20

Playoffs

Semi finals (best of 7)
 Nelson defeated Trail 4 games to 0 (11-2, 6-5 OT, 4–2, 6–2)
 Spokane defeated Kimberley 4 games to 2 (4-6, 5–4, 4-3 2OT, 2–3, 2–0, 4–3)

Final (best of 7)
 Nelson defeated Spokane 4 games to 1 (10-2, 0–5, 4–1, 5–4, 3-2 OT)

The Nelson Maple Leafs advanced to the 1966-67 Western Canada Allan Cup Playoffs.

References 

Western International Hockey League seasons
Wihl
Wihl